Aeroflot Flight 811 was a scheduled Soviet domestic passenger flight from Komsomolsk-on-Amur to Blagoveshchensk that collided mid-air on 24 August 1981 with a Tupolev Tu-16K strategic bomber over Zavitinsky District in Amur Oblast, Russian SFSR, Soviet Union (now Russia). The sole survivor, 20-year-old passenger Larisa Savitskaya from Antonov An-24RV, was rescued on the third day after the accident.

Background and collision
Antonov An-24RV departed from Komsomolsk-on-Amur at 14:56 local time, after a four-hour delay due to weather conditions. The crew consisted of first pilot Alexander Mirgorodsky, co-pilot Valery Shevelev, navigating officer Fedosy Kryzhanovsky, flight engineer Nikolai Dimitriyev and flight attendant Galina Borisova. Among the passengers was one child. Larisa Savitskaya and her husband Vladimir were returning from their honeymoon.

On the same day, at 16:00 and 16:01 local time two Tupolev Tu-16Ks left Zavitinsk air base for weather reconnaissance. At 16:21 local time, one of them (serial number 6203106) collided with the Aeroflot An-24RV, 70 km east of Zavitinsk air base. The collision occurred in good lighting conditions, with a visibility of over 10 km. Savitskaya was sound asleep at that moment. The Tu-16K razed off the An-24RV's roof and severed both wings. Both aircraft disintegrated and fell on taiga terrain. The fragments of Antonov An-24RV were scattered in a south-western direction, 1020 m from the collision point, on a  area.

Savitskaya was conscious during the fall, which lasted eight minutes. She survived partly because the  aircraft fragment she was in started to glide and landed on a soft, swampy glade. Savitskaya also pushed against the seat with her hands and feet, "perhaps hoping to absorb the blow" in her own words. The impact with the ground, however, knocked her temporarily unconscious. She sustained a concussion, a broken arm and rib and some spinal injuries.

Investigation
The investigation concluded that the flight operations director at Zavitinsk air base did not use radar assistance to track the Tupolevs, which became the direct cause of the accident. Additionally, there was a poor coordination between the local civilian and military air traffic control due to flawed air traffic regulations. Military prosecutors placed the responsibility for the accident on the pilots of both aircraft.

Aftermath
The first reports about the accident in the Soviet press were censored, saying Savitskaya had crashed in a homemade glider. Savitskaya was warned by the KGB not to reveal the accident to the public; she spoke openly about the accident for the first time on 11 January 2001 in Moscow. Savitskaya was paid 75 Soviet rubles ($20) compensation by Aeroflot.

Portrayal in films 
The One, disaster-survival adventure film based on the real events. The film tells the story of Savitskaya's life, catastrophe and rescue.

See also
List of sole survivors of airline accidents or incidents
Vesna Vulović

References

External links
Accident description (Aviation Safety Network)

1981 in the Soviet Union
811
Aviation accidents and incidents in 1981
Accidents and incidents involving the Antonov An-24
Mid-air collisions
Mid-air collisions involving military aircraft
Mid-air collisions involving airliners
Aviation accidents and incidents in the Soviet Union
August 1981 events in Europe